In kinematics, absement (or absition) is a measure of sustained displacement of an object from its initial position, i.e. a measure of how far away and for how long. The word absement is a portmanteau of the words absence and displacement. Similarly, absition is a portmanteau of the words absence and position.

Absement changes as an object remains displaced and stays constant as the object resides at the initial position. It is the first time-integral of the displacement (i.e. absement is the area under a displacement vs. time graph), so the displacement is the rate of change (first time-derivative) of the absement. The dimension of absement is length multiplied by time. Its SI unit is meter second (m·s), which corresponds to an object having been displaced by 1 meter for 1 second. This is not to be confused with a meter per second (m/s), a unit of velocity, the time-derivative of position.

For example, opening the gate of a gate valve (of rectangular cross section) by 1 mm for 10 seconds yields the same absement of 10 mm·s as opening it by 5 mm for 2 seconds. The amount of water having flowed through it is linearly proportional to the absement of the gate, so it is also the same in both cases.

Occurrence in nature
Whenever the rate of change ′ of a quantity  is proportional to the displacement of an object, the quantity  is a linear function of the object's absement. For example, when the fuel flow rate is proportional to the position of the throttle lever, then the total amount of fuel consumed is proportional to the lever's absement.

The first published paper on the topic of absement introduced and motivated it as a way to study 
flow-based musical instruments, such as the hydraulophone, to model empirical observations of some hydraulophones in which obstruction of a water jet for a longer period of time resulted in a buildup in sound level, as water accumulates in a sounding mechanism (reservoir), up to a certain maximum filling point beyond which the sound level reached a maximum, or fell off (along with a slow decay when a water jet was unblocked).  Absement has also been used to model artificial muscles, as well as for real muscle interaction in a physical fitness context.  Absement has also been used to model human posture.

As the displacement can be seen as a mechanical analogue of electric charge, the absement can be seen as a mechanical analogue of the time-integrated charge, a quantity useful for modelling some types of memory elements.

Applications
In addition to modeling fluid flow and for Lagrangian modeling of electric circuits, absement is used in physical fitness and kinesiology to model muscle bandwidth, and as a new form of physical fitness training.  In this context, it gives rise to a new quantity called actergy, which is to energy as energy is to power.  Actergy has the same units as action (joule-seconds) but is the time-integral of total energy (time-integral of the Hamiltonian rather than time-integral of the Lagrangian).

Fluid flow in a throttle:

Relation to PID controllers
PID controllers are controllers that work on a signal that is proportional to a physical quantity (e.g. displacement, proportional to position) and its integral(s) and derivative(s), thusly defining PID in the context of Integrals and Derivatives of a position of a control element in the Bratland sense

Example of PID controller (Bratland 2014):
 P, Position;
 I, Absement;
 D, Velocity.

Higher integrals
Just as displacement and its derivatives form kinematics, so do displacement and its integrals form "integral kinematics" (Janzen et al. 2014), giving rise to the ordered list of n-th derivatives of displacement:

Strain absement
Strain absement is the time-integral of strain, and is used extensively in mechanical systems and memsprings:
 a quantity called absement which allows mem-spring models to display hysteretic response in great abundance.

Anglement
Absement originally arose in situations involving valves and fluid flow, for which the opening of a valve was by a long "T"-shaped handle, which actually varied in angle rather than position.  The time-integral of angle is called "anglement" and it is approximately equal or proportional to absement for small angles, because the sine of an angle is approximately equal to the angle for small angles.

Phase space: Absement and momentement
In regards to a conjugate variable for absement, the time-integral of momentum, known as momentement, has been proposed.

This is consistent with Jeltsema's 2012 treatment with charge and flux as the base units rather than current and voltage.

References

External links

Motion (physics)
Vector physical quantities